Whitland railway station serves the town of Whitland in Carmarthenshire, Wales. It is located on the West Wales Line from Swansea. To the west of the station, a branch line diverges towards Pembroke; the main line continues to Milford Haven and Fishguard Harbour.

Passenger services are operated by Transport for Wales Rail using a mixture of Class 150, Class 153 and Class 175s, and Great Western Railway who run services using Class 800 trains on summer Saturdays from London Paddington to Pembroke Dock.

History

A branch line to Milford Haven followed in 1863 and the Pembroke and Tenby Railway (P&T) arrived from Tenby in 1866; their route was built as standard gauge, rather than the SWR's broad gauge, and so initially the P&T had to terminate at its own station next to the main line one, which by now was owned by the Great Western Railway. This separate P&T station had opened on 4 September 1866 and was closed in August 1869. A single line was converted to dual gauge in 1868 to allow P&T trains to reach . Full-through-running trains between the two routes was made possible in 1872 with the conversion of the main line to standard gauge. The network in the area was completed when the Cardigan branch was opened in stages between 1873 and 1886.

From 1957 the station was rebuilt. On the up side it had a ticket hall, waiting room with refreshments, ladies waiting room, toilets, stationmaster's office, district inspector's office, parcels office, central heating, and a  steel and aluminium platform canopy. On the down side it had a  canopy, refreshment room and toilets.

Services 

Summer Saturday Class 800 services between London Paddington and Pembroke Dock also serve Whitland.

Rail and sea corridor to Ireland
Transport for Wales Rail boat trains to and from Fishguard Harbour serve the station. These connect with the Stena Line ferry to Rosslare Europort in Ireland with a daily morning and evening service in both directions. This route has been in existence since 1906.

Facilities
Despite being a once-major junction, the facilities at Whitland station are limited. There are neither toilet nor waiting room facilities available.  The main building located on the eastbound platform once contained a waiting room and ticket office, but is now closed and boarded up (tickets must therefore be purchased on board the train or prior to travel). Most of this platform is covered by a canopy, and west of the building rusting rails remain in one of the former bay platforms. Across the footbridge, waiting shelters are provided on the westbound platform. There is in fact a serviceable bay platform behind this, accessed from the Pembroke Dock branch, but this is seldom used for passenger trains as services from the branch do not normally terminate at Whitland.

Train running information is provided by timetable posters, digital display screens and a customer help point on each side.  Step-free access is available to both operational platforms, though the eastbound one is via a steep ramp.

References

External links

Railway stations in Carmarthenshire
DfT Category F1 stations
Former Great Western Railway stations
Railway stations in Great Britain opened in 1854
Railway stations in Great Britain opened in 1866
Railway stations in Great Britain closed in 1869
Railway stations served by Great Western Railway
Railway stations served by Transport for Wales Rail
1866 establishments in Wales
Whitland